The Redan Football Netball Club (nicknamed the Lions) is an Australian rules football and netball club located in the city of Ballarat, Victoria. The football team currently competes in the Ballarat Football League. Redan has a history of 59 Premierships including 11 Senior Football Premierships and was named the Victorian Country Football League Most Disciplined Club in 2004 & 2005.

Redan players have also won the Henderson Medal (Ballarat Football League's best player award) on 14 occasions with two players, Michael Smith (1994, 1994) and Jarrod Edwards (2006, 2007, 2008 and 2009) winning the award in consecutive years. Edwards is the first player in BFL history to win four consecutive Henderson Medals.

The club also has four winners of the Tony Lockett Medal, for the leading goalscorer in the Ballarat Football League. Redan currently play their home matches at City Oval in Ballarat and play in a predominantly maroon strip with a maroon top band and a lion logo on the chest.

The first Redan game was reported in The Ballarat Star Saturday September 2, 1871 against the Ballarat Football Club. The Redan team was made up from miners from the Band of Hope mine and their average weight was 14 Stone (90 kg). The Star reported that the Redan team were everywhere, kicking and tripping regardless of the consequences.

Former Adelaide Crows coach, the late Phil Walsh, played for Redan prior to be being recruited by Collingwood.

Honours

BFL Premierships
1946, 1952, 1975, 1976, 1977, 2002 v Sunbury, 2003 v Sunbury, 2006 v East Point, 2007 v Sunbury, 2009 v East Point, 2011 v Sunbury

Henderson Medal winners
1946 - Stan Webb, 1949 - W.Ebery, 1951 - Keith Rawle, 1955 - Graham Willey, 1957 - Bill McKenzie, 1976 - David Jenkins, 1981 - Greg Packham, 1992 - Michael Phyland, 1993 - Michael Smith, 1994 - Michael Smith, 2006 - Jarrod Edwards, 2007 - Jarrod Edwards, 2008 - Jarrod Edwards, 2009 - Jarrod Edwards, 2017 - Nathan Horbury

Tony Lockett Medal winners
1952 - W.Wells (73 goals), 1953 - W.Wells (116), 1975 - D.Atkinson (67), 1982 - G.Cahir (84)

Bibliography
 History of Football in the Ballarat District  by John Stoward -

References

External links

Official site

Sports clubs established in 1943
Australian rules football clubs established in 1943
1943 establishments in Australia
Ballarat Football League clubs
Netball teams in Victoria (Australia)
Australian rules football clubs in Victoria (Australia)
Sport in Ballarat